The  2023 United States Open Championship is the 123rd U.S. Open, the national open golf championship of the United States. It is a 72-hole stroke play tournament scheduled for June 15–18 on the North Course of Los Angeles Country Club in Los Angeles, California.

Course

Field
The field for the U.S. Open is made up of players who gain entry through qualifying events and those who are exempt from qualifying. The exemption criteria include provisions for recent major champions, winners of major amateur events, and leading players in the world rankings. Qualifying is in two stages, local and final, with some players being exempted through to final qualifying.

Exemptions
This list details the exemption criteria for the 2023 U.S. Open and the players who qualified under them; any additional criteria under which players were exempt is indicated in parentheses.

1. Recent winners of the U.S. Open (2013–2022)

Bryson DeChambeau
Matt Fitzpatrick (2,11)
Dustin Johnson (6)
Martin Kaymer
Brooks Koepka (7)
Jon Rahm (11,12)
Justin Rose
Jordan Spieth (11)
Gary Woodland (2)

2. The leading ten players, and those tying for tenth place, in the 2022 U.S. Open

Keegan Bradley
Joel Dahmen
Adam Hadwin
Hideki Matsuyama (6,11)
Denny McCarthy
Rory McIlroy (11,12)
Collin Morikawa (7,8,11)
Scottie Scheffler (6,11)
Will Zalatoris (11)

3. The winner of the 2022 U.S. Senior Open

Pádraig Harrington

4. The winner of the 2022 U.S. Amateur

Sam Bennett (a)

5. Winners of the 2022 U.S. Junior Amateur and U.S. Mid-Amateur, and the runner-up in the 2022 U.S. Amateur

Ben Carr (a)
Ding Wenyi (a)
Matthew McClean (a)

6. Recent winners of the Masters Tournament (2019–2023)

Tiger Woods

7. Recent winners of the PGA Championship (2018–2023)

Phil Mickelson
Justin Thomas (9,11)

8. Recent winners of The Open Championship (2018–2022)

Shane Lowry (10)
Francesco Molinari
Cameron Smith (9,11)

9. Recent winners of The Players Championship (2021–2023)

10. The winner of the 2022 BMW PGA Championship

11. All players who qualified and were eligible for the 2022 Tour Championship

Sam Burns
Patrick Cantlay
Corey Conners
Tony Finau (12)
Brian Harman
Tom Hoge
Max Homa (12)
Billy Horschel
Viktor Hovland
Im Sung-jae
Lee Kyoung-hoon
Joaquín Niemann
J. T. Poston
Xander Schauffele (12)
Adam Scott
Scott Stallings
Sepp Straka
Sahith Theegala
Aaron Wise
Cameron Young

12. Winners of multiple PGA Tour events from the 2022 U.S. Open to the start of the 2023 tournament

Tom Kim

13. The top 5 players in the FedEx Cup standings as of May 22 who are not yet exempt

May 22

14. The top player on the 2022 Korn Ferry Tour full-season points list

Justin Suh

15. The top 2 players on the 2022 European Tour rankings who are not yet exempt as of May 22

May 22

16. The top player on the 2023 European Tour rankings as of May 22 who is not yet exempt

May 22

17. The top 2 point earners from the European Tour "U.S. Open Qualifying Series" who are not otherwise exempt

June 5

18. The winner of the 2022 Amateur Championship

Aldrich Potgieter (a)

19. The winner of the Mark H. McCormack Medal in 2022
Keita Nakajima forfeited his exemption by turning professional.

20. The individual winner of the 2023 NCAA Division I Men's Golf Championship

May 29

21. The winner of the 2023 Latin America Amateur Championship
Mateo Fernández de Oliveira (a)

22. The leading 60 players on the Official World Golf Ranking as of May 22

May 22

23. The leading 60 players on the Official World Golf Ranking if not otherwise exempt as of June 12

June 12

24. Special exemptions

Qualifiers
Twelve final qualifying events are scheduled, nine of which are in the United States:

Notes

References

External links

United States Golf Association
Coverage on the PGA Tour's official site
Coverage on the European Tour's official site

U.S. Open (golf)
Golf in California
Sports in Los Angeles
U.S. Open
U.S. Open (golf)
U.S. Open
U.S. Open